Octavio Eduardo Dotel Diaz (born November 25, 1973) is a Dominican former professional baseball pitcher. Dotel played for 13 major league teams, the second most teams played for by any player in the history of Major League Baseball (MLB), setting the mark when he pitched for the Detroit Tigers on April 7, 2012, breaking a record previously held by Mike Morgan, Matt Stairs, and Ron Villone. Edwin Jackson broke this record in 2019. Dotel's longest tenure with any one team was the five seasons he spent with the Houston Astros.

Dotel won the 2011 World Series as a member of the St. Louis Cardinals. In 2013, as part of the World Baseball Classic champions along with fellow Dominicans Robinson Canó and Santiago Casilla, Dotel became one of the few players in history to win both a World Series and a World Baseball Classic.

Career

New York Mets
Dotel graduated from Liceo Cansino Afuera in the Dominican Republic and was signed by the New York Mets as an amateur free agent in 1993. He played for their minor league affiliate in the Dominican Summer League through 1994 and then promoted through the Mets' minor league system for the next several seasons. Dotel made his MLB debut on June 26, 1999, for the Mets, taking the loss in a 7–2 defeat to the Atlanta Braves. His first MLB win came July 1, 1999, against the Florida Marlins.  He ended the season as the winning pitcher in Game 5 of the 1999 National League Championship Series against the Braves.

He was voted Player of the Week for the week of July 25, 1999.

Houston Astros
On December 23, 1999, Dotel was traded by the Mets with Roger Cedeño and minor leaguer Kyle Kessel to the Houston Astros for Mike Hampton and Derek Bell.

In 2000, Dotel went 3–7 with 16 saves and a 5.40 ERA in 50 games (16 starts). His role was converted from a starter to a relief pitcher for the Astros, and Dotel began to fill in as closer for an injured Billy Wagner. This season marked the first time in National League history that a pitcher had over 15 starts and 15 saves (the only other season in MLB history came in the American League in 1999 when Tim Wakefield won six games in 17 starts and attained 15 saves for the Boston Red Sox).

In 2001, Dotel again began the season as a starter but moved into the bullpen as the setup man for Wagner. Dotel had an excellent season in 2002; he led all relievers with 118 strikeouts and helped secure a well-reputed bullpen for the Astros at that time. By 2003, Dotel and Wagner were joined by future Astros closer Brad Lidge and all three partook in a historic event in which six Astros pitchers combined for a no-hitter against the New York Yankees on June 11, 2003.

After the 2003 season, Wagner was traded to the Philadelphia Phillies, and Dotel started 2004 as the closer for the Astros.

Oakland Athletics
On June 24, 2004, Dotel was traded to the Oakland Athletics in a three-team trade that sent Carlos Beltrán to the Astros, minor leaguer Mike Wood, Mark Teahen, and John Buck to the Kansas City Royals. Dotel served as closer for the Athletics and finished the 2004 season with a combined 6–6 record with a 3.69 ERA and a career-high 36 saves (22 for the A's and 14 for the Astros) in 77 relief appearances.

Dotel began 2005 as closer for the Athletics again, but had a rough start and went on the 60-day disabled list on May 21. It was later announced on June 2 that he would undergo Tommy John surgery, ending his season after just 15 games.

New York Yankees
Dotel signed a one-year, $2 million deal with the New York Yankees in December 2005. He missed the first four months of the 2006 season, recovering from his Tommy John surgery. Dotel had a setback after developing tendinitis in his elbow while on a rehab assignment with the Trenton Thunder. This pushed his return into August as he went through another minor league assignment with the Columbus Clippers. Dotel pitched his first game in a Yankees uniform on August 16, coming into the game in the eighth inning against the Baltimore Orioles, facing two batters with one strikeout and one walk. He finished the season playing in 14 games with no record and an ERA of 10.80.

Kansas City Royals
Dotel became a free agent at the end of the 2006 MLB season. On December 8, 2006, he agreed to a one-year contract with the Kansas City Royals for $5 million. Dotel made 24 relief appearances to start the season, going 2–1 with 11 saves and a 3.91 ERA.

Atlanta Braves
On July 31, 2007, the Royals traded Dotel to the Atlanta Braves in exchange for pitcher Kyle Davies. He made his Braves debut on August 1, throwing a scoreless ninth inning in a 12–3 rout of the Astros. On August 10, Dotel was placed on the disabled list with a right shoulder strain. He made his return on September 22 escaping a bases-loaded jam which eventually led to a Braves win. He recorded a 4.70 ERA in nine appearances with the Braves, and he finished the season 2–1 with a 4.11 ERA in 33 combined relief appearances.

Chicago White Sox
On January 21, 2008, Dotel agreed to a two-year, $11 million deal with the Chicago White Sox.

Pittsburgh Pirates
On January 21, 2010, Dotel agreed to a one-year, $3.25 million deal with the Pittsburgh Pirates, plus bonuses for games finished. The deal also included a club option for 2011 for $4.5 million with a $250,000 buyout. Dotel started the year as the Pirates closer and stayed the closer until he was traded. He was 2–2 with 21 saves and a 4.28 ERA in 41 relief appearances with the Pirates.

Los Angeles Dodgers
On July 31, 2010, Dotel was traded to the Los Angeles Dodgers for James McDonald and Andrew Lambo. He appeared in 19 games with the Dodgers and went 1–1 with one save and a 3.38 ERA.

Colorado Rockies
On September 18, 2010, Dotel was traded to the Colorado Rockies for a player to be named later. Dotel was ineligible to play on the postseason roster, but it made no difference as Colorado missed the playoffs. Dotel appeared in eight games with the Rockies, going 0–1 with a 5.06 ERA.

Toronto Blue Jays
On December 29, 2010, Dotel agreed to a one-year, $3.5 million deal with the Toronto Blue Jays with a club option for 2012. He earned his 50th career victory on April 8, 2011, against the Los Angeles Angels of Anaheim.

St. Louis Cardinals

On July 27, 2011, Dotel was traded to the St. Louis Cardinals with Edwin Jackson, Marc Rzepczynski and Corey Patterson for Colby Rasmus, P. J. Walters, Trever Miller and Brian Tallet. Dotel got his first championship title when the Cardinals beat the Texas Rangers in the 2011 World Series.  On October 31, 2011, it was announced that Cardinals would not pick up his team option for the 2012 season, making Dotel a type A free agent.

Detroit Tigers
Dotel signed a one-year deal with the Detroit Tigers on December 7, 2011. He made his debut for them on April 7, 2012. The Tigers were Dotel's thirteenth major league team, allowing him to pass Matt Stairs, Mike Morgan and Ron Villone for the MLB record of the most teams for which a player played.

Dotel made his 700th appearance in a major-league game on April 21, 2012, in the nightcap of a double-header against the Texas Rangers.

Dotel entered the World Series for the second year in a row, but the Tigers lost to the San Francisco Giants in a four-game sweep. On October 30, 2012, the Tigers picked up Dotel's option for the 2013 season.

On April 23, 2013, Dotel was placed on the 15-day DL due to right elbow inflammation. He was transferred to the 60-day DL on June 8.

Retirement
On October 3, 2014, Dotel announced his retirement from professional baseball at the age of 40 after pitching 15 seasons for 13 MLB teams. His career strikeout rate of 10.8 per nine innings is the best in the history of baseball for right-handed pitchers with at least 900 innings pitched.

Pitching style
Dotel mainly threw a four-seam fastball from 90 to 93 mph. He had two breaking balls, mostly used in 2-strike counts: a sweeping slider in the low 80s and a curveball in the upper 70s. The slider was used against right-handed hitters, the curveball against left-handers. He was a strikeout pitcher throughout his career, finishing above 10 strikeouts per 9 innings in 10 full seasons.

Personal life
In November 1993, not long after Dotel signed his first contract with the New York Mets, his father was murdered. Emilio Dotel, 53, entered a taxi cab on his way home from work and was robbed, strangled, and killed. His body was found a day later  from his house in Santo Domingo, Dominican Republic. Emilio Dotel and his wife, Maria Magdalena Dotel, had three sons and two daughters.

Dotel is married to Massiel.  The couple have three children.

While playing for the St. Louis Cardinals, Dotel served as a mentor to fellow reliever Marc Rzepczynski.

In August 2019, Dotel was arrested on charges related to a drug trafficking and money laundering operation, while Luis Castillo was cited for related charges. Later that month, a judge cleared Dotel and Castillo of the money laundering charges. Dotel still faces a charge for allegedly possessing an illegal weapon at the time of his arrest.

See also

 List of Houston Astros no-hitters
 List of Houston Astros team records
 List of Major League Baseball career games finished leaders
 List of Major League Baseball no-hitters
 List of Major League Baseball players from the Dominican Republic
 List of Major League Baseball single-inning strikeout leaders

References

External links

1973 births
Living people
Atlanta Braves players
Binghamton Mets players
Capital City Bombers players
Chicago White Sox players
Colorado Rockies players
Columbus Clippers players
Detroit Tigers players
Dominican Republic expatriate baseball players in Canada
Dominican Republic expatriate baseball players in the United States
Gulf Coast Mets players
Gulf Coast Yankees players
Gulf Coast Tigers players
Houston Astros players
Kansas City Royals players
Lakeland Flying Tigers players

Los Angeles Dodgers players
Major League Baseball pitchers
Major League Baseball players from the Dominican Republic
New York Mets players
New York Yankees players
Norfolk Tides players
Oakland Athletics players
Pittsburgh Pirates players
Staten Island Yankees players
St. Louis Cardinals players
St. Lucie Mets players
Toronto Blue Jays players
Tampa Yankees players
Toledo Mud Hens players
Trenton Thunder players
Wichita Wranglers players
World Baseball Classic players of the Dominican Republic
2013 World Baseball Classic players